Genoa Airport  also named Christopher Columbus Airport ("Aeroporto Cristoforo Colombo" in Italian), and commonly named Aeroporto di Genova-Sestri Ponente (Genoa-Sestri Ponente Airport), after the city district where it is located, is an  international airport built on an artificial peninsula,  west of Genoa, Italy.

Overview
The airport is the most important one of Liguria and it serves the city and Port of Genoa, as well as considerable population in Southern Piedmont (Asti and Alessandria Provinces, Southern areas of Cuneo Province). In 2018, with 1,455,626 passengers having passed through the airport, Genoa is the 21st busiest Italian airport by passenger traffic. The Spanish low-cost airline Volotea operates one of its four bases in Italy in Genoa Airport.

It is currently operated by Aeroporto di Genova S.P.A., which has recently upgraded the airport complex. The airport is named after the notable Genoese navigator and explorer Christopher Columbus, who is recalled in the monument La Vela di Colombo. The airport was the manufacturing base for Piaggio Aerospace, an Italian aircraft design and production company.

In January 2022, Volotea announced to close their Genoa base after five years, leading to the cancellation of 14 routes.

The construction 
Building an offshore airport was not a strange or unique solution only for Genoa. Among the most conspicuous examples we can mention the infrastructures in New York or those of Nice, Venice, Gibraltar.

Airlines and destinations

Statistics

Ground transportation

By car

Genoa Airport can be reached by travelling in the city's inner roads and by the A10 Motorway, with the closest exit being 'Genova Aeroporto'.

By taxi

Taxi stands can be found just outside the airport. For groups of at least 3 people, taxi fares can be fixed between the airport and the city's main railway stations:

Genova Piazza Principe (€7)
Genova Brignole (€8)

By bus and train

The closest railway station to the airport is Genova Sestri Ponente-Aeroporto, served by Trenitalia regional trains to/from Piazza Principe/Brignole, Savona and Ventimiglia.

The station is then connected to the airport by a bus service called Flybus, operated by AMT, which departs with a 15 minutes frequency every day between 6.00 am and 10.00 pm. Fares are €1,50 (AMT single tickets) or €1,60 (AMT+Trenitalia integrated fares).

As of the 1st August 2020, regional bus operator APT resumed its Airport Shuttle service between the airport and the other localities in Genoa's Metropolitan City. A one way fare is €20, while a return journey costs €40. As of now, people wishing to travel on this service must book a seat at least 4 days before their travel date and must await a response from the operator's reservation department.

Incidents and accidents
On February 25, 1999, Alitalia Flight 1553, a Dornier 328, operated by Minerva Airlines, operated a flight from Cagliari-Elmas Airport to Genoa Cristoforo Colombo Airport. On landing on runway 29, the aircraft overshot the end of the runway and crashed into the sea, due to excessive tailwind and late touchdown. Four of the 31 passengers and crew died in the accident.

References

External links 
 
 Official website
 

Airports in Italy
Cristoforo Colombo Airport
Airport
Tourism in Genoa